Jean-Pierre Castaldi (born 1 October 1944) is a French actor. He is the father of French TV presenter and radio host  Benjamin Castaldi.

On Stage

Filmography

Television 

2000–2002 : Host of Fort Boyard

References

1944 births
Living people
French people of Italian descent
Male actors from Grenoble
French male stage actors
French male film actors
French male television actors